This article shows player statistics and all results & fixtures (official and friendly) that the club have played (and will play) during the 2013–14 season. In season 2013–14 Red Star will be competing in Serbian SuperLiga, Serbian Cup and UEFA Europa League.

Previous season positions

Club

Club management
{| class="toccolours" style="border:#f00 solid 1px; background:#fff; font-size:88%;"
|+ style="background:#f00; color:#fff; font-size:120%;"| Current management
|
 President:  Dragan Džajić
 Vice-president:  Nebojša Čović
 Vice-president:  Slaviša Kokeza
 Vice-president:  Ivica Tončev
 Sport director:  Zoran Stojadinović
 General secretary:  Miodrag Zečević
 Deputy general secretary:  Stefan Pantović
 Marketing director:  Goran Broćić

Coaching staff

Grounds

Kit

Players

Current squad

Foreign players
  Abiola Dauda
  Ifeanyi Onyilo
  Nejc Pečnik
  Omega Roberts
  Miguel Araujo

Players with dual citizenship
   Abiola Dauda
   Boban Bajković
   Filip Kasalica
   Marko Vešović
   Vukan Savićević

Transfers

In

Total spending:  Undisclosed (~ €1,500,000)

Loan return and promoted

Out

Total income:  Undisclosed (~ €4,960,000)

Loan out

Overall transfer activity

Spending
 Undisclosed (~ €1,500,000)

Income
 Undisclosed (~ €4,960,000)

Net expenditure
 Undisclosed (~ €3,460,000)

Non-competitive

Preseason

Uhrencup

Competitions

Overall

UEFA Europa League

Second qualifying round

Third qualifying round

Serbian Cup

Red Star will participate in the 8th Serbian Cup starting in First Round.

Matches

Serbian SuperLiga

The 2013–14 season is Red Star's 8th season in Serbian SuperLiga.

Matches

Results and positions by round

League table

Statistics

Squad statistics

Goalscorers
Includes all competitive matches. The list is sorted by shirt number when total goals are equal.

Clean sheets
Includes all competitive matches. The list is sorted by shirt number when total clean sheets are equal.

Captains

References

Red Star Belgrade seasons
Red Star Belgrade season
Serbian football championship-winning seasons